The Old Furnace Town Heritage Museum is an outdoor museum near Snow Hill, Maryland that uses a living history format with live demonstrations to re-create a vanished 19th-century community.  The museum contains various historic buildings, including most importantly the Nassawango Iron Furnace, an early 19th-century brick blast furnace that was used to smelt bog iron ore to make pig iron.  Other buildings, all of which have been moved to the site, include a church, a store, and several houses, one of which is used as an information center.

R. Frank Jones Museum
This building was Initially constructed in 1869 and moved to the Furnace Town Village in 1977.  The museum contains exhibits on the history of the local area and processing of pig iron.

Notes

External links
Furnace Town Living Heritage Museum (official website) 
Furnace Town Living Heritage Museum (Ocean City Vacation and Hotels Guide website)

Industry museums in Maryland
Living museums in Maryland
Museums in Worcester County, Maryland
Industrial buildings and structures in Maryland